A xyloside is a type of glycoside derived from the sugar xylose.

Proteoglycan (PG) synthesis is initiated by the transfer of D-xylose from UDP-xylose to a serine residue in core proteins. This natural primer acts as a template for the assembly of heparin sulfate, heparin, chondroitin sulfate, and dermatan sulfate side chains, depending on the tissue. However, in 1973 it was determined that synthetic B-D-xylosides can prime glycosaminoglycan (GAG) synthesis by substituting for the core xylosylated protein.

Many Beta-D-xylosides have been studied for use as xylose primes with varying results.

 Priming requires the Beta-anomer of xylose. 
 Priming activity correlates with the activity of the aglycone (cite).
 The most active xyloside primers contain O or S in glycosidic linkage. 
 Priming is dose dependent.
 Beta-D-xylosides prime GAGs in most cells.
 Most of the material created from Beta-D-xylosides priming is excreted into the growth media.
 Beta-D-xylosides prime chondroitin sulfate or dermatan sulfate whereas priming of heparin sulfate poorly, except with the appropriate aglycones.
      
Beta-D-xylosides consist of a xylose in beta linkage to an aglycone.  The aglycone often consists of a hydrophobic compound which aids in carrying the sugar moiety to the golgi membrane where GAG synthesis takes place.

List of xylosides 
 2-naphthol-B-D-xyloside

References 

 The influence of p-nitrophenyl beta-d-xyloside on the synthesis of proteochondroitin sulfate by slices of embryonic chick cartilage.,Okayama M, Kimata K, Suzuki S.,J Biochem. 1973 Nov;74(5):1069-73. (http://jb.oxfordjournals.org/cgi/reprint/74/5/1069)

Glycosides by glycone type